AFL South Africa (formed as "Footy South Africa" in 1997) is the governing body and federation for Australian rules football in South Africa. Its name is due to its formal affiliation in 2004 to the AFL Commission the game's world governing body.

The sport is known in Australia pride itself in South Africa as an all-inclusive sport accommodating people of any form of background or affiliation.

Key events for AFL South Africa are week-in week-out participation programs from 7 years to open age, mainly in primary and high schools, footyWILD Premier League competition contested by 8 clubs and other local competitions. The programs are in North West, Gauteng, Kwa Zulu Natal & Western Cape Provinces.

History

The introduction of the game was in 1997 by the Australian Army based in a town of Mafikeng and early 2003 it was registered as Footy South Africa, then eventually in October 2004 was affiliated to the AFL then became Australian Football League South Africa. Brian Dixon was appointed inaugural president in 2004.

The body was one of the first international governing bodies to affiliate with the Australian Football League, renamed as "AFL South Africa" in 2004.

footyWild

footyWILD Brand was launched in 2007 to be the South African identity of Aussie Rules which has programs such as footyWILD Big 5 for primary schools which is equivalent of AFL Auskick, footyWILD High for high schools, footyWILD Extreme for open age competition & footyWILD Roar Talent for talent scouting.

National team

South African National team is South African Lions taking its name from the King of the African jungles. The South African National Team participated in all the previous AFL International Cup Events in 2002 as (South African Buffaloes), 2005, 2008, 2011 and 2014 (as South African Lions).

The South African Teams were coached by Dale Alsford (2002), Steven Harrison (2005), Jason McCartney (2008), Steward Edge (2011) and Wayne Miller (2014). Benjamin Motuba, one of the longest serving football player been involved from day one in 1997 is the current S.African Lions Head Coach and the first South African coach marked to coach at the 2017 AFL International Cup.

Leagues and competitions

footyWILD Premier League
A national competition contested of Wild Cats FC, Platinum Buffaloes FC, Warriors FC, Super Owls FC, Hurricanes FC, Giant Bees FC, Nyanga Blue Birds FC and Real Divines FC

footyWILD National Championships - Extreme
An open age national competition contested by four provinces namely Gauteng, North West and Kwa Zulu Natal.
footyWILD National Championships - High
An Under 17 national competition contested by four provinces namely Gauteng, North West and Kwa Zulu Natal.

National Championships

The first national championships were played in 2008. The inaugural winners were North West Dockers

2008 national champions
footyWILD Extreme (Open Age) Grand Final North West Dockers 9.11 (65) d Western Cape Magpies 4.9 (33) coached by Reginald Mokotedi currently serving as a Director on the AFL South Africa Board.

2009 national champions :
Grand Final – 1st vs 2nd Western Cape Magpies 10.8 (68) def. North West Dockers 4.3 (27)

Coming out of the 2009 Nationals, was the selection of two footyWILD futures squads.

The Inland senior and youth squads comprising players from Gauteng and North-West Province; meanwhile the Coastal senior and youth squads are made up of players from Kwa-Zulu Natal and Western Cape Provinces.

Players selected come from a range of backgrounds including existing National representatives, established Provincial players and young athletes identified through the ROAR Talent program.

The first camps took place in November were both squads played against the Flying Boomerangs Indigenous Youth team in 2010.

A major camp involving both squads provided a selection opportunity to the SA Lions for the fourth AIS/AFL Academy tour of South Africa in 2011 that took place at Sahara Park, Newlands which was a South Africa's domestic season opener.

Inbound Tours Hosted To Date:

Australian Army - 1997
Brisbane Lions & Fremantle Dockers - 1998 (Exhibition Match in Cape Town)
Fremantle Football Club - 1998, 2008 and 2009
St Kilda Football Club - 2004
Convicts - 2005
Australian Indigenous Team (Flying Boomerangs) - 2006, 2008, 2010 and 2013
Geelong College - 2007
Subiaco FC - 2007
Australian Institute of Sport / AFL Under 17 - 2007 & 2011
Carlton FC vs. Fremantle Dockers (Exhibition Match in Pretoria's Supersport Park Stadium)
Carlton FC - 2008
West Coast Eagles FC - 2008
Collingwood FC - 2008
School Sport Australia - 2012, 2013
St Marys FC - 2012, 2014 & 2016
Hawthorn FC - 2013

The partners are

North West Academy of Sport
Australian High Commission
BlueScope
Australian Business Chamber of Commerce Southern Africa

See also

Australian rules football in South Africa
Countries playing Australian rules football

References

External links

Australian rules football in South Africa
Australian rules football governing bodies outside Australia
Sports governing bodies in South Africa
Sports organizations established in 2004